Gaetano Gigante (1770 in Naples – 1840) was an Italian painter and engraver, active mainly in Naples, Italy. He was the father of Giacinto Gigante, one of the main painters of the School of Posillipo, Emilia Gigante and Ercole Gigante (1815–1860); and Achille Gigante (1823–1846), a lithographer and designer of acquaforte. Gaetano received his training with Giacinto Diano.

Sources
Derived from Italian Wikipedia

18th-century Italian painters
Italian male painters
19th-century Italian painters
19th-century Italian male artists
Painters from Naples
18th-century Neapolitan people
1770 births
1840 deaths
18th-century Italian male artists